Ezequiel Montero Román (22 February 1893 – 17 April 1972) was a Spanish footballer, referee and manager in Spain at the beginning of the 20th century. As a player, he helped the Madrid national team win two Prince of Asturias Cups in 1917 and 1918. As a coach, he managed the Spain national team in four games between 1926 and 1927.

Playing career 
He was born at the beginning of 1893 in Madrid, a city in which he would develop an extensive career linked to football. In the 1910s, he played as a midfielder for Racing de Madrid, with whom he won the 1914–15 Centro Championship together with Joaquín Pascual, Ricardo Álvarez and Feliciano Rey. Since he was a Racing de Madrid player, he was eligible to play for the Madrid national team, for whom he played several matches between 1915 and 1918, being a member of the side that participated in the first edition of the Prince of Asturias Cup in 1915, an official inter-regional competition organized by the RFEF. Montero was also a member of the Madrid team captained by José María Castell, which against all odds, claimed the trophy in the 1917 Prince of Asturias Cup, which was the first in Madrid's history.

Refereeing career
Montero began his refereeing career when he was still an active player, which was normal at the time. In 1915, after satisfactory examinations, he joined the Board of the College of Referees of the Center, the first College of Referees in Spain, roughly at the same time as the likes of Carlos Dieste and of then-teammate at Racing, Antonio Pelous. According to posting practice, he also performed regular service as a coastal judge.

As a referee, he oversaw matches of the Central Championship, and even of the Copa del Rey. He was a referee in the first-ever Spanish league in 1929, refereeing 22 matches in the Primera División (1929–1942). In total, he oversaw more than 100 matches between the Regional, First and Second Division, in a career that lasted more than 30 years (1915–1947).

Together with Eulogio Aranguren and Enrique Peris, he holds the peculiar distinction of having participated in the Prince of Asturias Cup as both a player and referee, given that Montero refereed one match in the competition, a semi-final between Galicia and Andalusia in the 1922–23 edition, ending in a 4-1 win to the Galicians.

At the request of the Portuguese Football Federation (FPF), he acted as a referee in the 1922 Campeonato de Portugal, which was the 1st edition of the Portuguese domestic cup. This match was a derby between Sporting CP and FC Porto, ending in a 2-0 win to the "Lions".

Coaching career
Between 1926 and 1927 he was the manager of the Spain national football team, leading the nation in four games that ended in 3 wins and 1 loss.

Honours

Club
Racing de Madrid
Centro Championship
Winners (1): 1914-15

International
Madrid XI
Prince of Asturias Cup:
Champions (2): 1917 and 1918

See also 
List of Spain national football team managers

References 

1893 births
1972 deaths
Spanish footballers
Atlético Madrid footballers
Spanish football managers
Spain national football team managers
Spanish football referees
Footballers from Madrid